The adjoint state method is a numerical method for efficiently computing the gradient of a function or operator in a numerical optimization problem.  It has applications in geophysics, seismic imaging, photonics and more recently in neural networks.

The adjoint state space is chosen to simplify the physical interpretation of equation constraints.

Adjoint state techniques allow the use of integration by parts, resulting in a form which explicitly contains the physically interesting quantity.  An adjoint state equation is introduced, including a new unknown variable.

The adjoint method formulates the gradient of a function towards its parameters in a constraint optimization form. By using the dual form of this constraint optimization problem, it can be used to calculate the gradient very fast. A nice property is that the number of computations is independent of the number of parameters for which you want the gradient.
The adjoint method is derived from the dual problem and is used e.g. in the Landweber iteration method.

The name adjoint state method refers to the dual form of the problem, where the adjoint matrix  is used.

When the initial problem consists of calculating the product  and  must satisfy , the dual problem can be realized as calculating the product , where  must satisfy . 
And 
 is called the adjoint state vector.

General case 

The original adjoint calculation method goes back to Jean Cea, with the use of the lagrangian of the optimization problem to compute the derivative of a functional with respect to a shape parameter.

For a state variable , an optimization variable , an objective functional  is defined. Usually, one would be interested in calculating  using the chain rule:

Unfortunately, the term  is often very hard to differentiate analytically since the dependance is defined through an implicit equation. The lagrangian functional can be used as a workaround for this issue.

has an associate lagrangian functional  defined by

The method of Lagrange multipliers states that a solution to the problem has to be a stationary point of the lagrangian, namely

The first equation is the so-called adjoint state equation,

Resolving this equation yields the adjoint state .
The process is even simpler when the operator  is self-adjoint or symmetric since the direct and adjoint state equations differ only by their right-hand side.

Example: Linear case 

Thus, we can write symbolically . The gradient would be

where  is a third order tensor,  is the dyadic product between the direct and adjoint states and  denotes a double tensor contraction. It is assumed that  has a known analytic expression that can be differentiated easily.

Numerical consideration for the self-adjoint case 
If the operator  was self-adjoint, the direct state equation and the adjoint state equation would have the same left-hand side. In the goal of never inverting a matrix, which is a very slow process numerically, a LU decomposition can be used instead to solve the state equation, in  operations for the decomposition and  operations for the resolution. That same decomposition can then be used to solve the adjoint state equation in only  operations since the matrices are the same.

See also 
 Backpropagation
 Adjoint equation
 Shape optimization
 Method of Lagrange multipliers

References

External links 

 A well written explanation by Errico: What is an adjoint Model? 
 Another well written explanation with worked examples, written by Bradley 
 More technical explanation: A review of the adjoint-state method for computing the gradient of a functional with geophysical applications
 MIT course 
 MIT notes 

Numerical analysis